In geometry, the metabiaugmented dodecahedron is one of the Johnson solids. It can be viewed as a dodecahedron with two pentagonal pyramids attached to two faces that are separated by one face. (The two faces are not opposite, but not adjacent either.) When pyramids are attached to a dodecahedron in other ways, they may result in an augmented dodecahedron, a parabiaugmented dodecahedron, a triaugmented dodecahedron, or even a pentakis dodecahedron if the faces are made to be irregular.

External links
 

Johnson solids